Anthribus fasciatus is a species of fungus weevil in the family Anthribidae. It occurs widely in Europe and is present in the Near East and North Africa; it has been introduced to North America. It preys on Eulecanium tiliae.

References 

Anthribidae
Beetles of North Africa
Beetles of Asia
Beetles of Europe
Beetles described in 1770
Taxa named by Johann Reinhold Forster